The Queen Silvia Nursing Award is a yearly prize for nursing talent that was established by Swedish Care International and Ideella Förening Forum For Elderly Care. The focus of the Award is to showcase new ideas and innovations stemming from nurses with the expressed mission to raise the quality of care for older adults and people living with dementia. 

Every year, nurse and nursing student applicants in the Queen Silvia Nursing Award network have the opportunity to submit their proposals to improve elderly care and dementia care. 

The application process has generated thousands of proposals within geriatric and dementia care. 

Winners receive a Euro 6000 cash prize as well as international networking and learning opportunities with network partners. 

The first Queen Silvia Nursing Award scholar was announced on the 23rd of December, 2013 to coincide with Her Majesty Queen Silvia of Sweden’s 70th birthday. 

The Queen Silvia Nursing Award is currently available in seven countries: Sweden, Finland, Poland, Germany, Lithuania, University of Washington School of Nursing and Brazil.

Recipients

References

External links
Forum For Elderly Care
Swedish Care International
Queen Silvia Nursing Award

Scholarships in Sweden
Awards established in 2013
Nursing awards
Nursing in Sweden